InterBase is a relational database management system (RDBMS) currently developed and marketed by Embarcadero Technologies. InterBase is distinguished from other RDBMSs by its small footprint, close to zero administration requirements, and multi-generational architecture. InterBase runs on the Microsoft Windows, macOS, Linux, Solaris operating systems as well as iOS and Android.

Technology
InterBase is a SQL-92-compliant relational database and supports standard interfaces such as JDBC, ODBC, and ADO.NET.

Small footprint
A full InterBase server installation requires around 40 MB on disk. A minimum InterBase client install requires about 400 KB of disk space.

Embedded or server
InterBase can be run as an embedded database or regular server.

Data controller friendly inbuilt encryption
Since InterBase XE, InterBase includes 256-bit AES-strength encryption that offers full database, table or column data encryption. This assists data controllers conform with data protection laws around at-rest data by separating encryption and access to the database, ensuring the database file is encrypted wherever it resides. The separation of the encryption also enables developers to just develop the application rather than worry about the data visible from a specific user login.

Multi-generational architecture

Concurrency control
To avoid blocking during updates, Interbase uses multiversion concurrency control instead of locks.  Each transaction will create a version of the record. Upon the write step, the update will fail rather than be blocked initially.

Rollbacks and recovery
InterBase also uses multi-generational records to implement rollbacks rather than transaction logs.

Drawbacks
Certain operations are more difficult to implement in a multi-generational architecture, and hence perform slowly relative to a more traditional implementation. One example is the SQL COUNT verb. Even when an index is available on the column or columns included in the COUNT, all records must be visited in order to see if they are visible under the current transaction isolation.

History

Multiversion concurrency control before InterBase
Multiversion concurrency control is described in some detail in sections 4.3 and 5.5 of the 1981 paper "Concurrency Control in Distributed Database Systems" by Philip Bernstein and Nathan Goodman—then employed by the Computer Corporation of America. Bernstein and Goodman's paper cites a 1978 dissertation by D.P. Reed which quite clearly describes MVCC and claims it as an original work.

Early years

Jim Starkey was working at DEC on their DATATRIEVE 4th generation language 4GL product when he came up with an idea for a system to manage concurrent changes by many users. The idea dramatically simplified the existing problems of locking which were proving to be a serious problem for the new relational database systems being developed at the time.  Starkey, however, had the idea after he had spun off his original relational database project to another group and a turf war ensued.  Starkey left the company after shipping the first version of the Rdb/ELN product.

Although InterBase's implementation is much more similar to the system described by Reed in his MIT dissertation than any other database that existed at the time and Starkey knew Bernstein from his previous position at the Computer Corporation of America and later at DEC, Starkey has stated that he arrived at the idea of multiversion concurrency control independently. In the same comment, Starkey says:

The inspiration for multi-generational concurrency control was a database system done by Prime that supported page level snapshots. The intention of the feature was to give a reader a consistent view of the database without blocking writers. The idea intrigued me as a very useful characteristic of a database system.

He had heard that the local workstation vendor Apollo Computer was looking for a database offering on their Unix machines, and they agreed to fund development. With their encouragement he formed Groton Database Systems (named after the town, Groton, Massachusetts, where they were located) on Labor Day 1984 and started work on what would eventually be released as InterBase. In 1986 Apollo suffered a corporate shakeup and decided to exit the software business, but by this time the product was making money.

The road to Borland
Between 1986 and 1991 the product was gradually sold to Ashton-Tate, makers of the famous dBASE who were at the time purchasing various database companies in order to fill out their portfolio. The company was soon in trouble, and Borland purchased Ashton-Tate in 1991, acquiring InterBase as part of the deal.

Open source
In early 2000, Borland announced that InterBase would be released under open-source, and began negotiations to spin off a separate company to manage the product. When the people who were to run the new company and Borland could not agree on the terms of the separation, InterBase remained a Borland product, and the source code for InterBase version 6 was released under a variant of the Mozilla Public License in mid-2000.

With the InterBase division at Borland under new management, the company released a proprietary version of InterBase version 6 and then 6.5. Borland released several updates to the open source code before announcing that it would no longer actively develop the open source project. Firebird, an open source fork of the InterBase 6 code, however, remains in active development.

In 2001, a backdoor was discovered (and fixed) in the software that had been present in all versions since 1994.

CodeGear
On February 8 of 2006, Borland announced the intention to sell their line of development tool products, including InterBase, Delphi, JBuilder, and other tools , but instead of selling the divisions, Borland spun them out as a subsidiary on 14 November 2006. InterBase, along with IDE tools such as Delphi and JBuilder were included in the new company's product lineup. Then on 7 May 2008, Borland and Embarcadero Technologies announced that Embarcadero had "signed a definitive asset purchase agreement to purchase CodeGear."  The acquisition, for approximately $24.5 million, closed on 30 June 2008.

Recent releases
At the end of 2002, Borland released InterBase version 7, featuring support for SMP, enhanced support for monitoring and control of the server by administrators, and more. Borland released InterBase 7.1 in June 2003, 7.5 in December 2004, and 7.5.1 on June 1, 2005.

In September 2006, Borland announced the availability of InterBase 2007. Its new features include point in time recovery via journaling (which also allows recoverability without the performance penalty of synchronous writes), incremental backup, batch statement operations, new Unicode character encodings, and a new ODBC driver.

In September 2008, Embarcadero announced the availability of InterBase 2009. Its new features include full database encryption, selective column-level data encryption and over-the-wire encryption offering secure TCP/IP communication via Secure Sockets Layer (SSL).

In September 2010, Embarcadero announced the availability of InterBase XE. Its new features include a 64 bit client and server, improved security, improved scalability, support for dynamic SQL in stored procedures, and optimized performance of large objects with stream methods.

In 2013/2014 Embarcadero added iOS and then Android to the available supported platforms in InterBase XE3. Additionally InterBase IBLite was released - a run time royalty free edition of InterBase covering Windows, macOS, iOS and Android.

In December 2014, embarcadero released InterBase XE7 offering a brand new, patent pending change tracking technology called "Change Views.". Added Ubuntu to the certified Linux platforms and also added 64bit Linux support. Additional 64bit transaction ID's were introduced and new distinguished data dumps enabling rapid updates of read only copies of the master database.

In March 2017, Embarcadero released InterBase 2017. InterBase 2017 includes InterBase ToGo for Linux, Server wide monitoring support for InterBase Server,  a number of language enhancements (including derived tables and common table expressions, truncate table for faster data removal), enhancements to Change Views for expanding a subscription with a table wide scope, new transaction isolation levels and transaction wait time management.

In Nov 2019, Embarcadero released InterBase 2020, followed by Update 1 release in May 2020. The InterBase 2020 release adds a number of new features, including tablespaces support for InterBase, allowing for better performance on servers with multiple data storage options. See further at https://www.embarcadero.com/products/interbase/version-history

See also
 Comparison of relational database management systems
 List of relational database management systems

References

External links
InterBase product page 
How to connect with Interbase database with Ole Db

Client-server database management systems
CodeGear software
Cross-platform software
 
MacOS database-related software
Proprietary database management systems
Relational database management software for Linux
Windows database-related software